Callum John Taylor (born 26 June 1997) is an English cricketer who played for Essex County Cricket Club. Primarily a right-handed batsman, he also bowls right-arm medium. He made his  Twenty20 debut for Essex against Hampshire in May 2015. In December 2015 he was named in England's squad for the 2016 Under-19 Cricket World Cup.

References

External links
 
 

1997 births
Living people
English cricketers
Cricketers from Norwich
Essex cricketers
Norfolk cricketers